H. G. Ramulu is Indian politician from Karnataka. He is member of Indian National Congress. He was elected four times as the Member of Parliament from Koppal in Northern Karnataka.

References

Lok Sabha members from Karnataka
People from Koppal district
Indian National Congress politicians
India MPs 1980–1984
India MPs 1984–1989
India MPs 1998–1999
India MPs 1999–2004